The Hong Kong High End Audio Visual Show (香港高級視聽展) is held every year in Hong Kong Convention and Exhibition Centre for audio-visual companies to showcase their electronics and products.  Organized by Audiotechnique Magazine, it is the biggest audio-visual event in South-East-Asia.

Feature 

Famous high-end AV brands from all over the world such as Europe, the United States, Japan, Hong Kong and Mainland China, exhibit their latest products at the show. Software including CD, SACD, DVD & LP's, as well as audiophile accessories including cables & tuning devices, are displayed and sold at special prices.

Admission 

The admission fee for multiple entries for the show is HK$ 80, and comes with a complimentary SACD as a souvenir given out at a first-come-first-served basis.

External links
 Hong Kong High End Audio Visual Show by AudioTechnique (Chinese)
 Fair Preview by Hong Kong Convention & Exhibition Centre 

Trade fairs in Hong Kong